Alfred Jones may refer to:

Born before 1900
Alf Jones (footballer, born 1861) (1861–1935), Walsall and England footballer
Alf Jones (Australian footballer) (1885–1929), Australian footballer for Melbourne
Alfred Jones (engraver) (1819–1900), English engraver
Alfred Jones (football manager) (fl. 1885–1915), Small Heath (Birmingham) manager 1892–1908
Alfred Jones (Kent cricketer), English cricketer
Alfred Jones (umpire) (1859–1949), cricket test match umpire
Alfred D. Jones (1814–1902), first postmaster of Omaha City, Nebraska Territory
Alfred Daniel Jones (1857–1893), North Carolina State Legislator and US Consul General, Shanghai
Alfred Edwin Jones (1894–1973), Irish architect
Alfred G. Jones (1846–1905), British Baptist missionary to China
Alfred Garth Jones (1872–1955), English illustrator
Alfred Gilpin Jones (1824–1906), Lieutenant-Governor of Nova Scotia
Alfred Gresham Jones (1824–1915), Irish architect who moved to Australia after 1888
Alfred James Jones (1871–1945), Australian politician
Alfred Lewis Jones (1845–1909), British ship-owner
Alfred M. Jones (1837–1910), American politician and businessman
Alfred Stowell Jones (1832–1920), English recipient of the Victoria Cross

Born in or after 1900
Alf Jones (footballer, born 1937), English football full back for Leeds United and Lincoln City in the 1960s
Alfie Jones (born 1997), English footballer for St Mirren
Alfred Jones (boxer) (born 1946), American Olympic boxer
Alfred Winslow Jones (1900–1989), hedge fund manager
Alfred Jones (footballer, born 1902) (1902–?), English footballer for Crewe Alexandra and Stoke
Alfred Jones (footballer, born 1900) (1900–1959), footballer for Wrexham
Alfred Jones (Northamptonshire cricketer) (1900–1986), English cricketer